Russian Mission Airport  is a state-owned public-use airport located in Russian Mission, a city in the Kusilvak Census Area of the U.S. state of Alaska.

Facilities 
It has one runway designated 17/35 with a 3,600 by 100 ft (1,097 x 30 m) gravel surface. It also has a seaplane landing area designated 18W/36W which covers an area of the Yukon River measuring 3,000 by 500 ft (914 x 152 m).

Airlines and destinations

Prior to its bankruptcy and cessation of all operations, Ravn Alaska served the airport from multiple locations.

Accidents and incidents
On Wednesday, August 31, 2016, a collision occurred near Russian Mission Airport involving a Ravn Connect Cessna Caravan 208B EX aircraft that had been leased from Hageland Aviation Services and a Renfro's Alaskan Adventures Piper PA-18 Super Cub, killing the three people on board the Cessna Caravan 208B and the two on board the Piper aircraft. The Ravn Connect flight was a commercial one from Russian Mission Airport to Marshall Don Hunter Sr. Airport in Marshall, while the Renfro's Alaskan Adventures aircraft was on a charter flight from Bethel Airport to a hunting location.

References

External links 
 FAA Alaska airport diagram (GIF)
 

Airports in the Kusilvak Census Area, Alaska